Andrey Ignatov (born 3 February 1968) is a retired Russian long jumper. His personal best jump was 8.34 metres, achieved in June 1995 in Moscow.

International competitions

References

1968 births
Living people
Russian male long jumpers
Olympic male long jumpers
Olympic athletes of Russia
Athletes (track and field) at the 1996 Summer Olympics
World Athletics Championships athletes for Russia
Russian Athletics Championships winners